The United Kingdom Children's Cancer Study Group or UKCCSG is a group whose purpose is to facilitate and coordinate collaborative research into childhood cancer.

Participants from centres throughout the United Kingdom contribute ideas for research and pool their experience to promote the development of clinical excellence in the management of cancer in children.

On 1 August 2006 the UK Children's Cancer Study Group merged with the UK Childhood Leukaemia Working Party to form the Children's Cancer and Leukaemia Group. Please see website www.cclg.org.uk  or Wikipedia entry under Children's Cancer and Leukaemia Group  for more details.

External links
official site

Research organisations in the United Kingdom